Earl of Kilmarnock was a title created twice in the Peerage of Scotland for the Boyd family. It was first created in 1454 for Robert Boyd, Great Chamberlain of Scotland. It was created a second time in 1661 for William Boyd, 10th Lord Boyd.  Both titles were forfeited in 1746.

Thomas Boyd, the elder son of Robert Boyd, 1st Lord Boyd—and father of the second one—was created Earl of Arran in 1467, but both titles were forfeit in 1469. Considerable confusion exists over the numbering of the Lords Boyd; this article follows the numbering used in the Oxford Dictionary of National Biography.

The 4th Earl of Kilmarnock was the father of the 15th Earl of Erroll. The Kilmarnock title was revived in 1831 for the latter's grandson, William George Hay, 18th Earl of Erroll, who was created Baron Kilmarnock in the Peerage of the United Kingdom. Since 1941, this title is a separate peerage.

Ancestors
Robert Boyd (witnessed a charter concerning Irvine, North Ayrshire in 1205).
Robert Boyd (fought at the Battle of Largs in 1263 in support of the Scottish Crown).
Sir Robert Boyd, 1st of Kilmarnock (fought at the Battle of Bannockburn in 1314 and captured at the Battle of Halidon Hill in 1333)
Sir Thomas Boyd, 2nd of Kilmarnock (captured at the Battle of Neville's Cross in 1346)
Sir Thomas Boyd, 3rd of Kilmarnock (pardoned in 1409 by the Regent Albany for killing Neilson of Dalrymple, a personal enemy)
Thomas Boyd, 4th of Kilmarnock (d.1432) (hostage for James I of Scotland when he was imprisoned by the English)
Sir Thomas Boyd, 5th of Kilmarnock (d.1439) (killed Sir Alan Stewart of Darnely in a feud and was himself killed by Stewart's brother at the Battle of Craignaught Hill in 1439)

Lords Boyd (1454)
Robert Boyd, 1st Lord Boyd (died 1482) 
James Boyd, 2nd Lord Boyd  (c. 1469–1484) 
Alexander Boyd, 3rd Lord Boyd (died after 1508)
Robert Boyd, 4th Lord Boyd (died 1557 or 1558) (confirmed by a charter to the Lordship 1545 or 1546)
Robert Boyd, 5th Lord Boyd (c. 1517–1590)
Thomas Boyd, 6th Lord Boyd (c. 1547–1611)
Robert Boyd, 7th Lord Boyd (1595–1628)
Robert Boyd, 8th Lord Boyd (c. 1618–1640)
James Boyd, 9th Lord Boyd (died 1654)
William Boyd, 10th Lord Boyd (bef. 1646–1692) (created Earl Kilmarnock in 1661)

Earls of Kilmarnock (1661)

William Boyd, 1st Earl of Kilmarnock (b.1646–1692)
William Boyd, 2nd Earl of Kilmarnock (b.1676–1692)
William Boyd, 3rd Earl of Kilmarnock (b.1692–1717)
William Boyd, 4th Earl of Kilmarnock (b.1705–1746) (attainted/forfeit 1746)

See also
Earl of Erroll
Baron Kilmarnock

Notes

References

 
Forfeited earldoms in the Peerage of Scotland
1454 establishments in Scotland
1661 establishments in Scotland
Noble titles created in 1454
Noble titles created in 1661
1746 disestablishments in Scotland